Frits Soetekouw (6 June 1938 – 3 May 2019) was a Dutch footballer who played as a defender.

Biography
Born in Amsterdam, Soetekouw played at club level between 1961 and 1971. He played for De Volewijckers, Heracles, Ajax, PSV and DWS. He briefly captained Ajax, notably in the side's 5–1 win against Liverpool in 1966. He also once appeared for the Netherlands national team in 1962.

Soetekouw died on 3 May 2019, at the age of 80.

References

External links
 

1938 births
2019 deaths
Dutch footballers
Footballers from Amsterdam
Association football defenders
Netherlands international footballers
AFC Ajax players
AFC DWS players
Eredivisie players
Heracles Almelo players
PSV Eindhoven players
AVV De Volewijckers players